Hard Times is a 1915 British silent drama film directed by Thomas Bentley and starring Bransby Williams, Leon M. Lion and Dorothy Bellew. It is based on the 1854 novel Hard Times by Charles Dickens.

Cast
 Bransby Williams as Gradgrind
 Leon M. Lion as Tom Gradgrind
 Dorothy Bellew as Louisa
 Madge Tree as Rachael
 Mr. Forrest as Stephen Blackpool
 F. Lymons as Josiah Bounderby
 Will Corrie as Sleary
 Clara Cooper as Cissie Jupe
 J. Wynn Slater as James Harthouse

Bibliography
 Giddings, Robert & Sheen, Erica. From Page To Screen: Adaptations of the Classic Novel . Manchester University Press, 5 May 2000
 Mee, John. The Cambridge Introduction to Charles Dickens. Cambridge University Press, 2010.

External links

1915 films
1910s historical drama films
British historical drama films
1910s English-language films
Films directed by Thomas Bentley
British silent feature films
Films based on British novels
Films based on works by Charles Dickens
Films set in the 19th century
Works about the Industrial Revolution
Films set in England
British black-and-white films
1915 drama films
1910s British films
Silent drama films